Gerhard Graf-Martinez (born 1952 in Schorndorf, Baden-Württemberg) is a German Flamenco guitarist, author and composer. In 1982, he founded the Flamenco-Jazz trio “Modo Nuevo”. Being a member of the “Peña Flamenca Sierra Blanca Marbella”, he hosted the “Curso Internacional De La Guitarra Flamenca” in Marbella (Málaga) between 1984 and 1987. From 1987 to 1989, he performed as a duo together with a Jewish singer. Between 1989 and 1996, Graf-Martinez was regularly invited as docent to numerous international guitar seminars. He established “Guitar Days” in his home town, which he led until 1994. During 1989 and 1996, he was touring throughout Europe together with his wife, the flamenco dancer Lela de Fuenteprado. After that, Graf-Martinez worked more and more as an author. Since then he has worldwide published more than eight books - educational books with CDs, CD-ROM an DVDs - in English and in German.

In 2005 Gerhard Graf-Martinez was awarded the EduMedia-Award and the Comenius medal for his DVDs Flamenco Guitar. The DVD “Gipsy Guitar - Rumbas Flamencas“ is nominated for the “digita 2009“, a quality award for digital media education.

Led by the passion to the Flamenco Graf-Martinez developed a special metronome software for the Flamenco rhythms.

Publications
Flamenco Guitar Method Vol. 1 (CD-Audio) - ISMN: 979-0-001-13109-4
Flamenco Guitar Method Vol. 1 - Value Pack, NTSC (Book + DVD + CD-Audio) - ISMN: 979-0-001-13920-5
Flamenco Guitar Method Vol. 2 - ISMN: 979-0-001-13110-0
Flamenco Guitar Method Vol. 2 - Value Pack, NTSC (Book + DVD) - ISMN: 979-0-001-13922-9
Flamenco-Gitarrenschule Vol. 1 (CD-Audio) - ISMN: 979-0-001-08422-2
Flamenco-Gitarrenschule Vol.  2 - ISMN: 979-0-001-08423-9
Gipsy Guitar - Rumbas flamencas y mas (Play-Along-Album - Book with 2 Audio-CDs) - ISMN: 3-7957-5509-3
Gipsy Guitar - Rumbas flamencas y mas (CD-ROM) -  (EOL)
DVD - Flamenco-Gitarrenschule Vol 1 (de/en PAL) - 
Flamenco-Gitarrenschule Vol 1, Value Pack, Book + DVD + CD-Audio (de/en PAL) - ISMN: 979-0-001-13917-5
DVD - Flamenco-Gitarrenschule Vol 2 (de/en PAL) - 
Flamenco-Gitarrenschule Vol 2, Value Pack, Book + DVD (de/en PAL) - ISMN: 979-0-001-13918-2
DVD - Flamenco Guitar Method Vol 1 (en NTSC) - 
DVD - Flamenco Guitar Method Vol 2 (en NTSC) - 
DVD Gipsy Guitar Rumbas flamencas (2008) - 
Flamenco Metronome Graf-Martinez - Software für Mac/Win
Flametro - iOs metronome app
FlamencoPercusión for Logic Pro, GarageBand and Cubase
FlamencoPercusión for GarageBand iPad/iPhone
 Sheet Music Book (Print) - Flamenco Guitar Technics Vol. 1: Arpegios - Rasgueados - ISMN 979-0-9000067-0-7 - Deutsch | Español | English
 Sheet Music Book  (Print) - Flamenco Guitar Technics Vol. 2: Picados - Escalas - Ligados - ISMN 979-0-9000067-1-4 - Deutsch | Español | English
 Sheet Music Book  (Print) - Flamenco Guitar Technics Vol. 3: Acordes - Cadencias - ISMN 979-0-9000067-2-1 - Deutsch | Español | English
 iBook (ePub) - Flamenco Guitar Technics Vol. 1: Arpegios - Rasgueados - Deutsch | Español | English
 iBook (ePub) - Flamenco Guitar Technics Vol. 2: Picados - Escalas - Ligados - Deutsch | Español | English
 iBook (ePub) - Flamenco Guitar Technics Vol. 3: Acordes - Cadencias - Deutsch | Español | English

Discography
Modo Nuevo - Flamenco Latino - Boulevard Records 1987
Fingerprints - Acoustic Guitar Sampler K&M 1989
Monographie Vol. 6 Ethno Music - New Sounds Monza (Italy)
Monographie Vol. 11 Flamenco - New Sounds Monza (Italy)
Oase der Harmonie und Entspannung - Bell Records
Guitarrissimo - Boulevard Records
Schools for Nepal - Consonar 2005

See also
New Flamenco

External links
Flamenco guitar pubs Graf-Martinez - his official website.

1952 births
Living people
People from Schorndorf
Flamenco guitarists